Nigilgia pseliota is a moth in the family Brachodidae. It was described by Edward Meyrick in 1920. It is found in South Africa.

References

Endemic moths of South Africa
Brachodidae
Moths described in 1920